The Bayer designations d Velorum and D Velorum are distinct. 
Due to technical limitations, both designations link here. 

For the star :
 d Velorum, see HD 74772 (HR 3477)
 D Velorum, see HD 74753 (HR 3476)

See also 
 δ Velorum (Delta Velorum)

Vela (constellation)
Velorum, d